Topi Diwas is an event celebrated by Nepali people globally on 1 January of English Calendar wearing  Dhaka or Bhaad-gaaule Topi as their pride. All Nepali people wear Dhaka topi and Bhaad-gaaule topi on that day.

References

January observances